The Second Round is an English language novel by Sierra Leonean-Gambian writer and poet Lenrie Peters. The novel is Peters's first and only novel. The novel was first published in 1965, and subsequently reprinted in 1966 as part of the influential Heinemann African Writers Series. The novel is semi-autobiographical, following the experience of a western educated doctor, Dr. Kawa, who returns to Freetown to practice medicine.

Critics describe the novel as reflecting the concerns of West Africans during the immediately post-colonial African community, nationalism, westernization, the difficulty adjusting to returning to Africa from abroad, and the "ethos" of Freetown society at the time. The novel has overt Pan-Africanist political themes, juxtaposes the "black world versus the European". The book also describe characters in terms of Jungian psychology. Charles Larson called the novel "African Gothic", though this characterization was criticized by reviewer Omalara Leslie in Black World.

The novel has been compared to Chinua Achebe's No Longer at Ease and the works of fellow Gambian-born Sierra Leonean William Conton.

References 

African Writers Series
1965 novels
Gambian novels
Freetown
1965 debut novels